The 1981 NFL season was the 62nd regular season of the National Football League. The season ended with Super Bowl XVI when the San Francisco 49ers defeated the Cincinnati Bengals 26–21 at the Pontiac Silverdome in Michigan.

Draft
The 1981 NFL Draft was held from April 28 to 29, 1981 at New York City’s Sheraton Hotel. With the first pick, the New Orleans Saints selected running back George Rogers from the University of South Carolina.

New referee
Cal Lepore, the line judge for Super Bowl III and referee for the Miracle at the Meadowlands, retired prior to the 1980 season. He would later become supervisor of officials in the United States Football League. Tom Dooley, who was assigned Super Bowl XV as line judge at the end of the 1981 season, was promoted to referee to replace Lepore.

Major rule changes
It is illegal for any player to put adhesive or slippery substances such as the product “stickum” on his body, equipment or uniform. This rule is known as both the “Lester Hayes Rule” and the “Fred Biletnikoff Rule” since both players were notorious for using sticky substances to make it easier for them to intercept/catch passes.
An offensive player who comes into the game wearing an illegal number for the position he takes must report to the referee before the start of the next play.
The penalty for an ineligible receiver who touches a forward pass is a loss of down.
The penalty for illegal use of hands, arms, or body (including holding) is reduced from 15 yards to 10 yards.
The penalty for intentional grounding is modified: loss of down and 10 yards penalty from the previous spot, or if the foul occurs more than 10 yards from the line of scrimmage, loss of down at the spot of the foul.
Officials began wearing numbers 21 through 25 within their position groups after going no higher than number 20 in 1979 and 1980.

Deaths
July 1, 1981: Linebacker Rusty Chambers, the Miami Dolphins leading tackler in 1978 and 1979, died in an automobile accident.

Regular season

Scheduling formula

Final standings

Tiebreakers
Baltimore finished ahead of New England in the AFC East based on head-to-head sweep (2–0).
San Diego finished ahead of Denver in the AFC West based on better division record (6–2 to Broncos’ 5–3).
Buffalo was the second AFC Wild Card based on head-to-head victory over Denver (1–0).
Detroit finished ahead of Green Bay in the NFC Central based on better record against common opponents (4–4 to Packers’ 3–5).

Playoffs

Records, milestones, and notable statistics

Records Set
Most Passes Attempted, Season, 709
Minnesota Vikings
Most Punts, Season, 114
Chicago Bears
Most Yards, Punt Returns, Both Teams, Game, 282
Los Angeles Rams (219) vs Atlanta Falcons (63), Oct 11, 1981

Records Tied
Most Touchdowns, Passing, Single Team, Game, 7
San Diego Chargers (vs Oakland Raiders) Nov 22, 1981
Most Touchdowns, Punt Returns, Single Team, Game, 2
Los Angeles Rams (vs Atlanta Falcons) Oct 11, 1981

Baltimore Colts Defense
The 1981 Baltimore Colts were one of the worst defenses in NFL history; they set five dubious defensive records:

Most Points Allowed, Season, 533
Most Touchdowns Allowed, Season, 68
Most First Downs Allowed Season, 406
Most Yards Allowed, Season, 6,793
Fewest Punt Returns, Season, 12

Statistical leaders

Team

Awards

Coaching changes
Denver Broncos: Dan Reeves replaced the fired Red Miller.
Houston Oilers: Bum Phillips was fired and replaced by Ed Biles.
New Orleans Saints: Bum Phillips joined the Saints after being fired by the Oilers. Dick Nolan was fired after a 0–12 start in 1980, and Dick Stanfel took over as interim.
Washington Redskins: Joe Gibbs replaced Jack Pardee.

Stadium changes
The home of the San Diego Chargers, San Diego Stadium, was renamed Jack Murphy Stadium in memory of local sportswriter Jack Murphy

Uniform changes
 The Cincinnati Bengals made significant modifications to their uniforms for the first time since the team's debut in 1968, discontinuing the design similar to the Cleveland Browns' jerseys. Orange and black tiger stripes were added to the jerseys and pants. Black tiger stripes were also added to the orange helmets.
 The Dallas Cowboys adopted a new blue jersey which was darker than its predecessors and featured silver numbers. The Cowboys wore this blue jersey through 1994. 
 The Houston Oilers resumed wearing blue pants with their white jerseys.
 The Los Angeles Rams switched from gray to blue face masks

Television
This was the fourth and final year under the league's broadcast contracts with ABC, CBS, and NBC to televise Monday Night Football, the NFC package, and the AFC package, respectively. The league then negotiated to have all three networks renew their deals for another five years.

John Madden became the lead color commentator for CBS, replacing Tom Brookshier who moved into a play-by-play role. However CBS Sports executives debated on whether Madden should be paired with incumbent lead play-by-play announcer Pat Summerall or should #2 announcer Vin Scully be promoted to the role. To resolve the situation, both Scully and Summerall were paired with Madden in four-week stretches. Scully was paired with Madden during the first four weeks of the season while Summerall was primarily covering the US Open Tennis Championships. Then Summerall called games with Madden while Scully covered the Major League Baseball playoffs for CBS Radio. After the eighth week of the NFL season, CBS Sports executives decided that Summerall had better chemistry with Madden than Scully did. Scully was later assigned as a consolation prize the NFC Championship Game. After the season, he would move to NBC to cover Major League Baseball and golf, but he decided to never call NFL games again.

Regular season game not broadcast by Network TV

References

NFL Record and Fact Book
NFL History 1981–1990  (Last accessed December 4, 2005)
Total Football: The Official Encyclopedia of the National Football League

National Football League seasons
National Football League